Challenge of the Superfriends is an American animated television series about a team of superheroes which ran from September 9, 1978, to December 23, 1978, on ABC. The complete series (16 episodes) was produced by Hanna-Barbera Productions and is based on the Justice League and associated comic book characters published by DC Comics and created by Julius Schwartz, Gardner Fox and Mike Sekowsky. It was the third series of Super Friends cartoons, following the original Super Friends in 1973 and The All-New Super Friends Hour in 1977.

Format

First segment
As originally aired, this season featured adventures with Superman, Batman and Robin, Wonder Woman, Aquaman, and the Wonder Twins, similar to those that had aired the previous season in The All-New Super Friends Hour. These episodes were later shown using the opening credits of the All-New Super Friends Hour in syndication.

Second segment
The second segment of this season was Challenge of the Superfriends, a 16-episode series that came the closest to the comic books. Not only did Challenge have the Justice League of America, it was the first official Super Friends series to feature DC supervillains from the comics (apart from one episode with Gentleman Jim Craddock and another featuring Black Manta), and this series had 13 of them together as a group called the Legion of Doom. It included Superman foes like Lex Luthor, Brainiac, the Toyman, and Bizarro, and Batman foes like the Riddler and the Scarecrow. The Legion of Doom dwelt in a murky swamp and launched their attacks for global conquest from a sinister-looking, swamp-based, mechanical, flying headquarters called the Hall of Doom (which resembled Darth Vader’s helmet) as a suitable contrast with the Superfriends' gleaming Hall of Justice. Every week, the Legion schemed to either get rid of or destroy the Superfriends so they could conquer the world. The Superfriends themselves consisted of 11 Justice League heroes. Thanks to the first segment alone being used with the Challenge of the Superfriends opening and confusing references to the show, it is often mistakenly believed that the first and second segments were two separate shows.

Production background

Early development
When the Challenge of the Superfriends season was originally conceived, it was named "Battle of the Super Friends" and featured the introduction of Captain Marvel. The group that challenged the heroes was called the "League of Evil", led by Captain Marvel's nemesis Doctor Sivana. However, Filmation produced Shazam! and The New Adventures of Batman, which prevented the use of characters such as Mister Atom, King Kull, Beautia Sivana, The Joker, The Penguin, Mr. Freeze, and Catwoman. Early conceptual art drawn by Alex Toth also included Heat Wave, Poison Ivy, and Abra Kadabra.

Narration, music and character designs
Bill Woodson provides the uncredited voice of the narrator in Challenge of the Superfriends, and the opening narration was by Stanley Jones. The show's main theme and original music was composed and arranged by musical director Hoyt Curtin. The music supervisor was Paul DeKorte. Character designs for this particular Super Friends series were done by Andre LeBlanc.

Team composition experimentation
Hanna-Barbera's writers experimented with team composition as well. Challenge of the Superfriends added The Flash (Barry Allen), Green Lantern (Hal Jordan), and Hawkman (Katar Hol) who were members of the Justice League of America, as well as several new characters: Black Vulcan (who was based on the DC Comics character Black Lightning), Apache Chief, and Samurai. These characters were created to add racial and cultural diversity to the show (this was also mentioned in some of the episode introduction extras on the first two Challenge of the Super Friends DVDs).

Lineups

Superfriends/Justice League of America
Eleven heroes make up the Superfriends/Justice League of America. They are:

Legion of Doom
Thirteen villains comprise the Legion of Doom during the Challenge of the Superfriends series. They are:

Despite the claim in the program's title sequence that the Legion's members hail from "remote galaxies", only Brainiac and Sinestro are extraterrestrials; the remaining members are all natives of Earth (even though Bizarro called the Bizarro World home, he was created by Lex Luthor via a duplicator ray on Earth, technically making him a 'native' of Earth). Solomon Grundy is a zombie, an animated dead person, as the episode Monolith of Evil makes clear. In "History of Doom", even Solomon Grundy supposedly dies from the solar flare.

Voice cast
 Jack Angel – Flash, Hawkman, Samurai, Pierre Marcel (in "Battle at the Earth's Core"), Professor Nikaido (in "Journey Through Inner Space"), Fort Knox Guard (in "Wanted: The Superfriends"), Japanese Distress Caller (in "Monolith of Evil"), Soldier (in "Superfriends: Rest in Peace")
 Marlene Aragon – Cheetah, Queen of Hearts (in "Fairy Tale of Doom"), Hera (in "Battle of the Gods")
 Lewis Bailey – Captain Parkhouse (in "Doomsday"), Yerba's right-hand man (in "Conquerors of the Future)
 Michael Bell – Riddler, Zan, Gleek, Fearians (in "Invasion of the Fearians"), Rom-Lok (in "Terror From the Phantom Zone"), Young Lex Luthor (in "History of Doom"), Pete (in "Trial of the Superfriends"), Robot Outlaw (in "Batman: Dead or Alive"), Dr. Tomokawa (in "Journey Through Inner Space")
 Bill Callaway – Aquaman, Bizarro, Flash (in "Wanted: The SuperFriends), The Capricorn Kid (in "Batman: Dead or Alive"), Bizarro Alfred Pennyworth (in "Wanted: The Superfriends"), Robot Gangsters (in "The Rise and Fall of the Superfriends")
 Ted Cassidy – Brainiac, Black Manta, Barlocks (in "Conquerors from the Future"), Diamond Exchange Man (in "Superfriends: Rest in Peace"), British Soldier (in "The Giants of Doom"), Gorilla Guard (in "Revenge on Gorilla City")
 Melanie Chartoff – Witch (in "Swamp of the Living Dead")
 Henry Corden – Dr. Varga (in "Invasion of the Brain Creatures"), Brain Creature Leader (in "Invasion of the Brain Creatures"), North Pole Scientist (in "Invasion of the Brain Creatures"), Torahna (in "The World Beneath the Ice")
 Danny Dark – Superman, Commissioner James Gordon (in "Superfriends: Rest in Peace"), Superboy (in "History of Doom"), U.S. Mint Guard (in "Wanted: The Superfriends"), Man in Car (in "Monolith of Evil"), Radar Engineer (in "Doomsday"), Darkon's Robot Soldiers (in "The Demons of Exxor")
 Al Fann - Marine Base Commander (in "The Beasts Are Coming")
 Shannon Farnon – Wonder Woman, Aphrodite (in "Secret Origins of the Superfriends"), Hippolyta, Empress Zana (in "The World's Deadliest Game"), Swiss Scientist (in "Attack of the Vampire"), Medusa (in "Battle of the Gods"), Simora (in "Conquerors of the Future"), Lois Lane (in "Superfriends: Rest in Peace"), Raymara (in "The World Beneath the Ice"), Dr. Brooks (in "Invasion of the Brain Creatures")
 Ruth Forman – Giganta
 Bob Hastings – Pied Piper/Space Genius (in "The Pied Piper from Space")
 Bob Holt – Count Dracula (in "Attack of the Vampire"), Vienna Policeman (in "Attack of the Vampire"), Swiss Scientist (in "Attack of the Vampire"), Logar (in "Terror From the Phantom Zone"), Hong Kong Citizen (in "Terror From the Phantom Zone"), Australian Citizen (in "Terror From the Phantom Zone"), Gormack (in "The World Beneath the Ice"), Ozar (in "The World Beneath the Ice"), Correl (in "The World Beneath the Ice"), Brain Creature (in “Invasion of the Brain Creatures”), Telegraph Operator (in "Batman: Dead or Alive"), Robot Outlaw (in "Batman: Dead or Alive"), Zeus (in "Battle of the Gods"), Invisible Man (in "Battle of the Gods")
 Buster Jones – Black Vulcan, U.N. Representative (in "Trial of the Superfriends"), Plutonium Plant Guard (in "Swamp of the Living Dead"), Skier (in "Fairy Tale of Doom"), Galactic Police Officer (in "Doomsday"), Admiral Brighton (in "Sinbad and the Space Pirates")
 Stanley Jones – Lex Luthor, Opening Narration, Augustus Caesar (in "The Time Trap"), Evil Being (in "Swamp of the Living Dead"), Giant (in "Fairy Tale of Doom"), Hul (in "Terror from the Phantom Zone"), Jonathan Kent (in "Secret Origins of the Superfriends"), Jor-El (in "Secret Origins of the Superfriends"), Lord Darkon (in "Demons of Exxor"), Camelot Knight (in "The Time Trap"), Sinbad (in "Sinbad and the Space Pirates"), Fort Knox Guard (in "Wanted: The Superfriends"), Townsman #2 (in "Trial of the Superfriends"), Gorilla Guard (in "Revenge on Gorilla City"), Scotland Yard Man (in "Conquerors of the Future"), Manatoo (in "History of Doom"), Toran (in "The Incredible Space Circus")
 Casey Kasem – Robin, JLA Computer, Colorado Soldier (in "Superfriends: Rest in Peace"), Man from Parthenon (in "The Giants of Doom"), Space Pirate (in "Sinbad and the Space Pirates"), Subway Switchman (in "Conquerors of the Future"), Likan (in "Conquerors of the Future"), Professor Charleston (in "The Rise and Fall of the Superfriends")
 Don Messick – Scarecrow, Sinestro (later episodes), Astronaut #2 (in "Giants of Doom"), Domed City Ruler (in "Conquerors from the Future"), Fear-Gassed Gorilla (in "Revenge on Gorilla City"), Vartoo (in "The Final Challenge"), Mocking Kryptonian (in "Secret Origins of the Superfriends"), Ground Quake Kryptonian (in "Secret Origins of the Superfriends"), Plutonium Plant Guard (in "Swamp of the Living Dead"), White Rabbit (in "Fairy Tale of Doom")  
 Vic Perrin – Sinestro (in "Invasion of the Fearians" and "The Time Trap"), Dr. Starns (in "The Anti-Matter Monster"), Turkish Engineer (in "The Anti-Matter Monster"), Brain Creature (in "Invasion of the Brain Creatures"), Professor Reed (in "The Rise and Fall of the Superfriends"), Frankenstein's Monster (in "The Rise and Fall of the Superfriends")
 Renny Roker – U.N. Representative (in "The Pied Piper from Space")
 Stanley Ralph Ross – Gorilla Grodd, Nar-Tan (in "Doomsday"), Old Indian (in "History of Doom"), Darkon's Robot Soldiers (in "The Demons of Exxor"), Space Pirate (in "Sinbad and the Space Pirates"), Minotaur (in "Battle of the Gods")
 Dick Ryal – Captain Cold, Hall of Doom Computer, Abin Sur (in "Secret Origins of the Superfriends"), Captain Nemo's Sailor (in "Fairy Tale of Doom"), Gorilla Tracker (in "Revenge on Gorilla City")
 Michael Rye – Green Lantern, Apache Chief, Astronaut #1 (in "Giants of Doom"), Yerba (in "Conquerors from the Future"), Solovar (in "Revenge on Gorilla City"), Plutonium Plant Guard (in "Swamp of the Living Dead"), Sinbad's First Mate (in "Sinbad and the Space Pirates"), Vienna Policeman (in “Attack of the Vampire”)
 Olan Soule – Batman, Astronaut (in "The World's Deadliest Game"), Vol (in "Demons of Exxor"), Fort Knox Guard (in "Wanted: The Superfriends"), Scientist (in "The Time Trap"), Townsman #1 (in "Trial of the Superfriends"), Space Pirate (in "Sinbad and the Space Pirates"), Subway Engineer (in "Conquerors of the Future"), Train Passenger (in "Conquerors of the Future"), Darkon's Robot Soldiers (in "The Demons of Exxor")
 Jimmy Weldon – Solomon Grundy, Sphinx (in "Battle of the Gods")
 Frank Welker – Toyman, Lilliputians (in "Fairy Tale of Doom"), Rokan (in "Rokan: Enemy from Space"), Mister Mxyzptlk (in "The Rise and Fall of the Superfriends"), Wind-Up Baby (in "The World's Deadliest Game"), Wind-Up Cat (in "The World's Deadliest Game"), Gorilla Child (in "Revenge on Gorilla City"), Mort (in "Conquerors of the Future")
 Louise Williams – Jayna, Aphrodite (in "Battle of the Gods"), Young Giganta (in "History of Doom"), Sooba (in "History of Doom")
 Bill Woodson – Narrator, Perry White (in "Superfriends: Rest in Peace"), Rayno (in "History of Doom"), Captain Nemo (in "Fairy Tale of Doom"), Admiral Hubbard (in "Doomsday"), Dr. Willardson (in "The Incredible Space Circus"), Sheriff (in "Batman: Dead or Alive")

Episodes

Home media
Warner Home Video (via DC Entertainment, Hanna-Barbera Cartoons and Warner Bros. Family Entertainment) originally released this season of Super Friends on two separate DVDs on June 1, 2004, the first one being Challenge of the Superfriends: Attack of the Legion of Doom, which featured the "Challenge" segments, and the second being Challenge of the Superfriends: United They Stand, which featured the Superfriends segments. Both DVDs only featured four episodes. The first season with the Challenge episodes was re-released as Challenge of the Superfriends: The First Season on July 6, 2004. The second one with the Super Friends episodes was named Super Friends: Volume Two and was re-released on May 24, 2005.

Spoofs
Cartoon Network produced a couple of commercials spoofing Challenge of the Superfriends.
 One dealt with the idiosyncratic nature of the Legion of Doom and Brainiac's odd manner of dress (Brainiac: "Look, I just want some pants...a decent pair of pants!" Solomon Grundy: "Solomon Grundy want pants, too!").
 The second, co-starring the Powerpuff Girls, dealt with Aquaman's powers (Aquaman: "My ability to talk to fish is of no use to us, Wonder Woman!") as well as the level of violence compared to today's cartoons, as Wonder Woman and Aquaman look away while the Powerpuff Girls beat up the Legion of Doom, going so far as to set the Scarecrow on fire. Most notably was Bubbles' double entendre reply to Wonder Woman's compliment on how they were developing as superheroes. "Someday we'll be as developed as you." Lex Luthor, since he was a villain, began laughing. His allies understood the joke and all of them laughed as well. When a piece of the Hall of Doom's ceiling fell on Luthor's head, everyone laughed.

In 2003, Cartoon Network Latin America aired the spoof series The Aquaman & Friends Action Hour that starred Aquaman as a children's television show host and the Legion of Doom as his bankrupt villains.

Legends of the Superheroes
The two NBC televised live-action specials of Legends of the Superheroes produced by Hanna-Barbera Productions was based largely on Challenge of the Superfriends while featuring Adam West, Burt Ward, and Frank Gorshin of the 1966 Batman television series fame (West would go on to voice Batman in SuperFriends: The Legendary Super Powers Show and The Super Powers Team: Galactic Guardians). The Justice League starred Batman, Robin, Captain Marvel, the Flash, Green Lantern, Hawkman, the Huntress, and the Black Canary against the Legion of Doom which featured Mordru leading Doctor Sivana, the Riddler, Giganta, Sinestro, the Weather Wizard, and Solomon Grundy (Superman, Wonder Woman, and their associate characters were absent due to the Superman film and Wonder Woman television series licensing the rights to them, respectively).

DC Super Friends
Despite using the main theme from The World's Greatest SuperFriends, the 2010 DC Super Friends "The Joker's Playhouse" shares several elements of its opening sequence with Challenge of the Superfriends, including introducing the Legion of Doom.

Robot Chicken DC Comics Special
The opening sequence of the Robot Chicken DC Comics Special parodies the opening of Challenge of the Superfriends with the Legion of Doom substituted for Robot Chicken original characters Chicken, Mad Scientist, Nerd, Humping Robot, Composite Santa, Gummy Bear, the Unicorn, and Bitch Puddin'. The Legion of Doom, Hall of Doom, and Hall of Justice also feature prominently in the episode.

In popular culture

In the video game DC Universe Online, if a player decides to play as a supervillain rather than as a superhero, they will be a part of the Legion of Doom, which meets in a large headquarters that is at the bottom of the ocean (similar to how the Legion's headquarters are on the show), with supervision by Noah Cuttler, a.k.a. the Calculator.

References

Featured link
 Challenge of the Super Friends  at Big Cartoon DataBase
 Cartoon Network: DOC – Challenge of The Superfriends – cached copy from Internet Archives

External links 
 
 Challenge of the Super Friends @ Legions of Gotham

1978 American television series debuts
1978 American television series endings
1970s American animated television series
1970s American science fiction television series
American animated television spin-offs
American children's animated action television series
American children's animated adventure television series
American children's animated science fantasy television series
American children's animated superhero television series
American Broadcasting Company original programming
English-language television shows
Animated television shows based on DC Comics
Television series by Hanna-Barbera
Television series set in 1978
Television series set in the 4th millennium
Animated Batman television series
Animated Justice League television series
Animated Superman television series
Wonder Woman in other media
Super Friends